The 37th parallel north is a circle of latitude that is 37 degrees north of the Earth's equatorial plane. It crosses Europe, the Mediterranean Sea, Africa, Asia, the Pacific Ocean, North America, and the Atlantic Ocean.

At this latitude the Sun is visible for 14 hours, 42 minutes during the summer solstice and 9 hours, 37 minutes during the winter solstice.

The 37th parallel north is roughly the northern limit of the visibility of Canopus, the second-brightest star of the night sky. Along with the 37th parallel south, it is the latitude at which solar irradiance is closest to the planetary average, with higher solar irradiance equatorward and lower poleward.

Around the world
Starting at the Prime Meridian and heading eastward, the parallel 37° north passes through:

{| class="wikitable plainrowheaders"
! scope="col" width="125" | Co-ordinates
! scope="col" | Country, territory or sea
! scope="col" | Notes
|-
| style="background:#b0e0e6;" | 
! scope="row" style="background:#b0e0e6;" | Mediterranean Sea
| style="background:#b0e0e6;" | 
|-
| 
! scope="row" | 
|
|-
| style="background:#b0e0e6;" | 
! scope="row" style="background:#b0e0e6;" | Mediterranean Sea
| style="background:#b0e0e6;" |
|-
| 
! scope="row" | 
|
|-
| style="background:#b0e0e6;" | 
! scope="row" style="background:#b0e0e6;" | Mediterranean Sea
| style="background:#b0e0e6;" |
|-
| 
! scope="row" | 
|
|-
| style="background:#b0e0e6;" | 
! scope="row" style="background:#b0e0e6;" | Mediterranean Sea
| style="background:#b0e0e6;" | Gulf of Tunis
|-
| 
! scope="row" | 
| Cap Bon
|-
| style="background:#b0e0e6;" | 
! scope="row" style="background:#b0e0e6;" | Mediterranean Sea
| style="background:#b0e0e6;" | Strait of Sicily, passing just north of the island of Pantelleria, 
|-valign="top"
| 
! scope="row" |  
| Island of Sicily— Province of Ragusa— Province of Siracusa
|-
| style="background:#b0e0e6;" | 
! scope="row" style="background:#b0e0e6;" | Ionian Sea
| style="background:#b0e0e6;" |
|-
| 
! scope="row" |  
| Peloponnese (Messenia)
|-
| style="background:#b0e0e6;" | 
! scope="row" style="background:#b0e0e6;" | Ionian Sea
| style="background:#b0e0e6;" | Messenian Gulf
|-valign="top"
| 
! scope="row" |  
| Peloponnese— Messenia— Laconia
|-
| style="background:#b0e0e6;" | 
! scope="row" style="background:#b0e0e6;" | Aegean Sea
| style="background:#b0e0e6;" | Myrtoan Sea
|-
| 
! scope="row" |  
| Island of Sifnos
|-
| style="background:#b0e0e6;" | 
! scope="row" style="background:#b0e0e6;" | Aegean Sea
| style="background:#b0e0e6;" |
|-
| 
! scope="row" |  
| Islands of Antiparos and Paros
|-
| style="background:#b0e0e6;" | 
! scope="row" style="background:#b0e0e6;" | Aegean Sea
| style="background:#b0e0e6;" |
|-
| 
! scope="row" |  
| Island of Naxos
|-
| style="background:#b0e0e6;" | 
! scope="row" style="background:#b0e0e6;" | Aegean Sea
| style="background:#b0e0e6;" |
|-
| 
! scope="row" |  
| Island of Levitha
|-
| style="background:#b0e0e6;" | 
! scope="row" style="background:#b0e0e6;" | Aegean Sea
| style="background:#b0e0e6;" |
|-
| 
! scope="row" |  
| Island of Kalymnos
|-
| style="background:#b0e0e6;" | 
! scope="row" style="background:#b0e0e6;" | Aegean Sea
| style="background:#b0e0e6;" |
|-
| 
! scope="row" | 
|
|-
| style="background:#b0e0e6;" | 
! scope="row" style="background:#b0e0e6;" | Aegean Sea
| style="background:#b0e0e6;" |
|-
| 
! scope="row" | 
| Passing through Adana and Nizip
|-
| 
! scope="row" | 
|
|-
| 
! scope="row" | 
|
|-
| 
! scope="row" | 
| Şemdinli district (for about )
|-
| 
! scope="row" | 
|
|-
| 
! scope="row" | 
|
|-
| style="background:#b0e0e6;" | 
! scope="row" style="background:#b0e0e6;" | Caspian Sea
| style="background:#b0e0e6;" |
|-
| 
! scope="row" | 
|
|-
| 
! scope="row" | 
|
|-
| 
! scope="row" | 
|
|-
| 
! scope="row" | 
|
|-
| 
! scope="row" | 
|
|-
| 
! scope="row" | 
|
|-
| 
! scope="row" | 
|
|-
| 
! scope="row" | 
| Gilgit-Baltistan - claimed by 
|-
| 
! scope="row" | 
| Xinjiang - for about 
|-
| 
! scope="row" | 
|-valign="top"
| 
! scope="row" | 
| Xinjiang  Qinghai  Gansu  Ningxia  Gansu  Shaanxi  Shanxi  Hebei  Shandong 
|-
| style="background:#b0e0e6;" | 
! scope="row" style="background:#b0e0e6;" | Yellow Sea
| style="background:#b0e0e6;" |Asan Bay
|-valign="top"
| 
! scope="row" | 
| South Chungcheong Province Gyeonggi ProvinceNorth Chungcheong ProvinceNorth Gyeongsang Province
|-
| style="background:#b0e0e6;" | 
! scope="row" style="background:#b0e0e6;" | Sea of Japan
| style="background:#b0e0e6;" |
|-valign="top"
| 
! scope="row" | 
| Island of Honshū:— Ishikawa Prefecture
|-
| style="background:#b0e0e6;" | 
! scope="row" style="background:#b0e0e6;" | Sea of Japan
| style="background:#b0e0e6;" | Toyama Bay
|-valign="top"
| 
! scope="row" | 
| Island of Honshū:— Niigata Prefecture— Nagano Prefecture— Niigata Prefecture— Gunma Prefecture − for around — Niigata Prefecture − for around — Fukushima Prefecture— Tochigi Prefecture— Ibaraki Prefecture— Fukushima Prefecture
|-
| style="background:#b0e0e6;" | 
! scope="row" style="background:#b0e0e6;" | Pacific Ocean
| style="background:#b0e0e6;" |
|-valign="top"
| 
! scope="row" | 
| California - landfall at Bonny Doon Beach just north of Santa Cruz Nevada Utah / Arizona border Colorado / New Mexico border Colorado / Oklahoma border Kansas / Oklahoma border Missouri Illinois (at its southernmost point) Kentucky - passing through Bowling Green and just south of Paducah Virginia - passing through Chesapeake Bay Bridge–Tunnel (specifically, the bridge between the two tunnels)
|-
| style="background:#b0e0e6;" | 
! scope="row" style="background:#b0e0e6;" | Atlantic Ocean
| style="background:#b0e0e6;" |
|-
| 
! scope="row" | 
| Santa Maria Island in the Azores 
|-
| style="background:#b0e0e6;" | 
! scope="row" style="background:#b0e0e6;" | Atlantic Ocean
| style="background:#b0e0e6;" |
|-
| 
! scope="row" | 
| Sagres Point
|-
| style="background:#b0e0e6;" | 
! scope="row" style="background:#b0e0e6;" | Atlantic Ocean
| style="background:#b0e0e6;" | 
|-
| 
! scope="row" | 
| Cape Santa Maria
|-
| style="background:#b0e0e6;" | 
! scope="row" style="background:#b0e0e6;" | Atlantic Ocean
| style="background:#b0e0e6;" | Gulf of Cádiz
|-
| 
! scope="row" | 
| Passing just north of Las Cabezas de San Juan
|-
| 
! scope="row" | 
| Passing just south of Antequera
|-
| style="background:#b0e0e6;" | 
! scope="row" style="background:#b0e0e6;" | Mediterranean Sea
| style="background:#b0e0e6;" |
|}

United States

In the United States, the parallel defines the southern borders of Utah, Colorado, and Kansas, and the northern borders of Arizona, New Mexico, and Oklahoma. It dates to the Kansas–Nebraska Act of 1854 when Congress divided Unorganized Territory into Kansas and Nebraska north of the 37th parallel and a remainder Indian Territory to the south. Before that the line had been thought to be the boundary between the Cherokee and Osage reservations - the  discrepancy resulting in the creation of the Cherokee Strip. Congress extended the line west to New Mexico Territory, thus defining which states and territories would constitute The South between the Colorado and Mississippi Rivers, and creating what later became the Oklahoma Panhandle.

Landmarks on the 37th parallel include Santa Cruz, California; Gilroy, California; Madera, California; Ubehebe Crater in Death Valley; Colorado City, Arizona; the Four Corners at the intersection with the 32nd meridian west from Washington (the only place where four U.S. states meet at a point); Cairo, Illinois; Bowling Green, Kentucky; and Newport News, and Hampton, Virginia.  It enters the Chesapeake Bay at the northernmost tunnel entrance / exit of the Hampton Roads Bridge Tunnel and the southernmost point of Old Point Comfort on the former Army base, Ft. Monroe.

The parallel 37° north formed the southern boundary of the historic and extralegal Territory of Jefferson.

See also
36th parallel north
Parallel 36°30′ north
38th parallel north

References

n37
Borders of Arizona
Borders of Utah
Borders of New Mexico
Borders of Colorado
Borders of Oklahoma
Borders of Kansas